Maria Elena Barrera Tapia (born 22 September 1960) is a Mexican politician affiliated with the PVEM. She currently serves as Senator of the LXII Legislature of the Mexican Congress representing the Mexico State.

References

1960 births
Living people
People from Toluca
Women members of the Senate of the Republic (Mexico)
Ecologist Green Party of Mexico politicians
Members of the Senate of the Republic (Mexico)
21st-century Mexican politicians
21st-century Mexican women politicians
Senators of the LXII and LXIII Legislatures of Mexico